The Impact Assessment Act and Canadian Energy Regulator Act, also referred to as Bill C-69, are two acts of the Parliament of Canada passed together by the 42nd Canadian Parliament in 2019. The bills gives authority to the federal government to consider how climate change might be impacted by proposed natural resource projects when undergoing federal approvals, while also being attentive to safeguarding market competitiveness.

History
The bill, which was introduced by the Minister of Environment and Climate Change Catherine McKenna, had its 1st reading on February 8, 2018, its 2nd reading on March 19, and its 3rd reading on May 8. It passed in the House of Commons of Canada on June 20, 2018 and in the Senate of Canada on June 6, 2019. C-69 received royal assent on June 21, 2019. The Acts were introduced together as Bill C-69 and entitled An Act to enact the Impact Assessment Act and the Canadian Energy Regulator Act, to amend the Navigation Protection Act and to make consequential amendments to other Acts.

Repeals
C-69 repealed the Canadian Environmental Assessment Act, 2012 and the National Energy Board Act.

Reception

C-69 was heavily criticized by Conservatives and the Canadian Association of Petroleum Producers, who feared that the new regulations would stifle investments to natural resources extraction in Canada. A June 20, 2019 National Post article called Bills C-69 and C-48 "controversial". The Post said that natural resources sector and some provinces had fiercely opposed the bills for over a year before its passage. Some critics of the bill say that it attacked the oil and gas sector in Canada, according to the Post. Alberta Premier Jason Kenney dubbed C-69 the "No pipeline bill".

However, university professors Martin Olszynski and Mark S. Winfield believes these criticisms are overblown. Winfred points out that the pre-2019 regulatory framework is much weaker than the one that existed for 40 years in Canada before it was axed in 2012. C-69 brought back some of the consultation requirements from that period, but according to Winfield, "the legislation is a relatively minor adjustment to what already existed". In fact, Olszynski believes that this bill would make it easier for projects to go forward, as project critics would be included in the decision-making process, and thus less likely to resort to litigation to make their voices heard.

Amendments
The Canadian Energy Regulator Act was amended by the Canada–United States–Mexico Agreement Implementation Act which was ratified on April 3, 2020, to replace references within the act to the North American Free Trade Agreement with references to the newer United States–Mexico–Canada Agreement.

Legal challenges
Alberta Premier Jason Kenney submitted an appeal with the Alberta Court of Appeal in 2021 alleging that Bill C-69 was an attack on the province's "vital economic interests" and that it has resulted in job loss. The lawsuit claims the bill is federal overreach in provincial jurisdictions and has a negative affect on future major oil and gas projects. On May 10, 2022, the Court of Appeal of Alberta (ABCA) found the Impact Assessment Act and the Canadian Energy Regulator Act, were unconstitutional.

See also
 Oil Tanker Moratorium Act (Bill C-48)

References

Canadian federal legislation
2019 in Canadian law
2012 in the environment
Environmental law in Canada
2019 in the environment
42nd Canadian Parliament